is a species of thistle in the family Asteraceae that is endemic to the Bonin Islands of Tōkyō Metropolis, Japan.

Taxonomy
The species was first described by Japanese botanist Gen-ichi Koidzumi in 1914. The specific epithet relates to the type locality (Chichijima) in the Bonin Islands.

Description
Cirsium boninense is a perennial plant with white flowers from May to June that grows to a height of  among the grasses and rocks in coastal areas, as well as on the forest floor.

Conservation status
Cirsium boninense is classed as Near Threatened on the Ministry of the Environment Red List.

See also
 Cirsium toyoshimae

References

boninense
Flora of the Bonin Islands
Endemic flora of Japan
Plants described in 1914